Jørn Sloth (born 5 September 1944 in , Thy, Denmark) is a Danish chess player who holds the chess titles of FIDE Master and Correspondence Chess Grandmaster. He was the eighth ICCF World Champion, 1975–80. 

In 1964 he, together with Rob Hartoch, won the Niemeyer tournament for European players under 20. 

Sloth obtained the IMC title in 1973 and the GMC title in 1978. He was the youngest player ever to win the Correspondence World Champion title.

References

External links
 
 
 
 Sloth at chessmail.com

1944 births
Living people
Danish chess players
Chess FIDE Masters
Correspondence chess grandmasters
World Correspondence Chess Champions